The 2008 World Men's Curling Championship was held from April 4–13, 2008 at Ralph Engelstad Arena in Grand Forks, North Dakota in the USA. The 12-team tournament took place in the 11,643 seat hockey arena on the grounds of the University of North Dakota.

Teams

Round-robin standings

Round-robin results

Draw 1
April 5, 14:00

Draw 2
April 5, 19:00

Draw 3
April 6, 09:00

Draw 4
April 6, 14:00

Draw 5
April 6, 19:00

Draw 6
April 7, 09:00

Draw 7
April 7, 14:00

Draw 8
April 7, 19:00

Draw 9
April 8, 09:00

Draw 10
April 8, 14:00

Draw 11
April 8, 19:00

Draw 12
April 9, 09:00

Draw 13
April 9, 14:00

Draw 14
April 9, 19:00

Draw 15
April 10, 09:00

Draw 16
April 10, 14:00

Draw 17
April 10, 19:00

Playoffs

3 vs 4

1 vs 2

Semifinal

Bronze medal game

Gold medal game

Player percentages
Top five percentages per position during the round robin.

See also
 2008 Brier
 2008 World Junior Curling Championships
 2008 World Mixed Doubles Curling Championship
 2008 Ford World Women's Curling Championship
 2008 Scotties Tournament of Hearts

References

External links
Ralph Engelstad Arena website
Official Website
2008 World Men's Updates

2008 Men
World Men's Curling Championships
Sports in Grand Forks, North Dakota
International curling competitions hosted by the United States
2008 in American sports
2008 in sports in North Dakota
Curling competitions in North Dakota